Prosiměřice is a market town in Znojmo District in the South Moravian Region of the Czech Republic. It has about 900 inhabitants.

Notable people
Václav Kosmák (1843–1898), writer and satirist; died here

References

Populated places in Znojmo District
Market towns in the Czech Republic